Ruslán Hinestrosa Ikaka Malabo (born 8 May 1993), known as Ruslán Hinestrosa, is an Equatorial Guinean basketball player who plays for Nueva Era and the Equatorial Guinea national team.

Hinestrosa played in the 2023 BAL qualification, averaging 6 points and 7.3 rebounds over four games.

References 

1993 births
Living people
Equatoguinean men's basketball players
People from Litoral (Equatorial Guinea)